Charles François Joseph Dugua (1740, in Toulouse or, 1774, in Valenciennes – October 16, 1802 in Crête-à-Pierrot), was a general of the French Revolution, present in the French Campaign in Egypt and Syria.

Military career

Dugua was in charge of Napoleon's fifth division in the Egypt Campaign, replacing the wounded General Kléber. He was sent by Napoleon to El Rahmaniya (Rahmanié) with Joachim Murat, stopping at Rosetta on the way. On July 6 July 1798, Napoleon in a letter stated that Dugua was present in Rosetta. Later during the uprising in Cairo, Dugua was responsible for the execution and decapitation of over 3000 Egyptians.

He died during the Battle of Crête-à-Pierrot, which was a major battle of the Haitian Revolution.  His is one of the names inscribed under the Arc de Triomphe.

References

1740 births
1802 deaths
French military leaders
Names inscribed under the Arc de Triomphe
French Republican military leaders of the French Revolutionary Wars
Military personnel from Toulouse
French generals